Radhe Radhe,, also spelled Radhey Radhey, is a Hindi expression used as a greeting and salutation in the Braj region of India. The greeting is associated with the Hindu goddess Radha, who is the consort of Krishna. She is worshiped as the queen of the Braj region, which includes Vrindavan, Barsana, Gokul, Nandgaon, Mathura, Govardhan and Bhandirvan.

Along with other common greetings like Jai Shri Krishna, Hare Krishna and Radhe Krishna, Radhe Radhe is also one of the most used greetings among the Vaishnava community. Jai Shri Radhe is a variant of Radhe Radhe often used in temples, which means "Glories to Radha".

It is common to see the phrase Radhe Radhe written on the walls of houses, on the trunks of trees and printed on the clothes of priests and devotees in the Braj region.

In popular culture 
"Radhe Radhe" is a song performed by Amit Gupta for the 2019 Bollywood movie Dream Girl.

See also 

 Jai Shri Krishna
 Jai Shri Ram
 Jai Siya Ram
 Radha
 Radha Krishna

References

External Links 
 https://lighttravelaction.com/ways-to-greet-in-india/

Hindu chants
Slogans
Hinduism and society
Krishna
Vaishnavism
Hindi words and phrases